Phaseolus rimbachii is a species of legume in the family Fabaceae.
It is found only in Ecuador.
Its natural habitat is subtropical or tropical moist montane forests.

References

rimbachii
Flora of Ecuador
Critically endangered plants
Taxonomy articles created by Polbot